The Douglas A-4 Skyhawk is a single-seat subsonic carrier-capable light attack aircraft developed for the United States Navy and United States Marine Corps in the early 1950s. The delta-winged, single turbojet engined Skyhawk was designed and produced by Douglas Aircraft Company, and later by McDonnell Douglas. It was originally designated A4D under the U.S. Navy's pre-1962 designation system.

The aircraft's five hardpoints support a variety of missiles, bombs, and other munitions. It is capable of carrying a bomb load equivalent to that of a World War II–era Boeing B-17 bomber, and can deliver nuclear weapons using a low-altitude bombing system and a "loft" delivery technique. The A-4 was originally powered by the Wright J65 turbojet engine; from the A-4E onwards, the Pratt & Whitney J52 engine was used.

Skyhawks played key roles in the Vietnam War, the Yom Kippur War, and the Falklands War. In 2022, nearly seven decades after the aircraft's first flight in 1954, some of the 2,960 produced (through February 1979) remain in service with the Argentine Air Force and the Brazilian Naval Aviation.

Design and development

The Skyhawk was designed by Douglas Aircraft's Ed Heinemann in response to a U.S. Navy call for a jet-powered attack aircraft to replace the older Douglas AD Skyraider (later redesignated A-1 Skyraider). Heinemann opted for a design that would minimize its size, weight, and complexity. The result was an aircraft that weighed only half of the Navy's weight specification. It had a wing so compact that it did not need to be folded for carrier stowage. The first 500 production examples cost an average of $860,000 each, less than the Navy's one million dollar maximum. The diminutive Skyhawk soon received the nicknames "Scooter", "Kiddiecar", "Bantam Bomber", "Tinker Toy Bomber", and, on account of its speed and nimble performance, "Heinemann's Hot-Rod". The XA4D-1 prototype set a world speed record of 695.163 mph on 15 October 1955.

The aircraft is of conventional post-World War II design, with a low-mounted delta wing, tricycle undercarriage, and a single turbojet engine in the rear fuselage, with two air intakes on the fuselage sides. The tail is of cruciform design, with the horizontal stabilizer mounted above the fuselage. Armament consisted of two 20 mm (.79 in caliber) Colt Mk 12 cannons, one in each wing root, with 100 rounds per gun (the A-4M Skyhawk II and types based on the A-4M have 200 rounds per gun), plus a large variety of bombs, rockets, and missiles carried on a hardpoint under the fuselage centerline and hardpoints under each wing (originally one per wing, later two).

The short-span delta wing did not require the complexity of wingtip folding, saving an estimated . Its spars were machined from a single forging that spanned across both wingtips. The leading edge slats were designed to drop automatically at the appropriate speed by gravity and air pressure, saving weight and space by omitting actuation motors and switches. Similarly the main undercarriage did not penetrate the main wing spar, designed so that when retracted only the wheel itself was inside the wing and the undercarriage struts were housed in a fairing below the wing. Thus the wing structure was lighter with the same overall strength. The rudder was constructed of a single panel reinforced with external ribs.

The turbojet engine was accessed for service or replacement by removing the aft section of the fuselage and sliding out the engine. This obviated the need for access doors with their hinges and latches further reducing weight and complexity. This is the opposite of what can often happen in aircraft design where a small weight increase in one area leads to a compounding increase in weight in other areas to compensate, creating a demand for more powerful, heavier engines, larger wing and empennage area, and so on in a vicious circle.

The A-4 pioneered the concept of "buddy" air-to-air refueling. This allows the aircraft to supply others of the same type, reducing the need for dedicated tanker aircraft—a particular advantage for small air arms or when operating in remote locations. This allows for greatly improved operational flexibility and reassurance against the loss or malfunction of tanker aircraft, though this procedure reduces the effective combat force on board the carrier. 

A designated supply A-4 would mount a center-mounted "buddy store", a large external fuel tank with a hose reel in the aft section and an extensible drogue refueling bucket. This aircraft was fueled up without armament and launched first. Attack aircraft were armed to the maximum and were given as much fuel as was allowable by maximum takeoff weight limits, which was far less than a full tank. 

Once airborne, they topped off their fuel tanks from the tanker using the A-4's fixed refueling probe on the starboard side of the aircraft nose. They could then sortie with both full armament and fuel loads. The A-4 was rarely used for refueling in U.S. service after the KA-3 Skywarrior tanker became available aboard the larger carriers.

The A-4 was also designed to be able to make an emergency landing, in the event of a hydraulic failure, on the two drop tanks nearly always carried by these aircraft. Such landings resulted in only minor damage to the nose of the aircraft which could be repaired in less than an hour.

The Navy issued a contract for the type on 12 June 1952, and the first prototype first flew from Edwards Air Force Base, California on 22 June 1954. Deliveries to Navy and Marine Corps squadrons (to VA-72 and VMA-224 respectively) commenced in late 1956.

The Skyhawk remained in production until 1979, with 2,960 aircraft built, including 555 two-seat trainers. The last production A-4, an A-4M of Marine squadron VMA-331 had the flags of all nations that operated the A-4 painted on its fuselage sides.

Operational history

United States

The Skyhawk proved to be a relatively common United States Navy aircraft export of the postwar era. Due to its small size, it could be operated from the older, smaller World War II-era aircraft carriers still used by many smaller navies during the 1960s. These older ships were often unable to accommodate newer Navy fighters such as the F-4 Phantom II and F-8 Crusader, which were faster and more capable than the A-4, but significantly larger and heavier than older naval fighters.

The Navy operated the A-4 in both Regular Navy and Naval Reserve light attack squadrons (VA). Although the A-4's use as a training and adversary aircraft would continue well into the 1990s, the Navy began removing the aircraft from its frontline attack squadrons in 1967, with the last ones (Super Foxes of VA-55/212/164) being retired in 1976.

The Marine Corps would not take the U.S. Navy's replacement warplane, the LTV A-7 Corsair II, instead keeping Skyhawks in service with both Regular Marine Corps and Marine Corps Reserve attack squadrons (VMA), and ordering the new A-4M model. The last USMC Skyhawk was delivered in 1979, and they were used until the mid-1980s before they were replaced by the equally small, but more versatile STOVL AV-8 Harrier II.

VMA-131, Marine Aircraft Group 49 (the Diamondbacks) retired its last four OA-4Ms on 22 June 1994. Trainer versions of the Skyhawk remained in Navy service, however, finding a new lease on life with the advent of "adversary training", where the nimble A-4 was used as a stand-in for the Mikoyan-Gurevich MiG-17 in dissimilar air combat training (DACT). It served in that role at TOPGUN until 1999.

The A-4's nimble performance also made it suitable to replace the McDonnell Douglas F-4 Phantom II when the Navy downsized its aircraft for the Blue Angels demonstration team, until McDonnell Douglas F/A-18 Hornets were available in the 1980s. The last U.S. Navy Skyhawks, TA-4J models belonging to the composite squadron VC-8, remained in military use for target towing, and as adversary aircraft, for combat training at Naval Station Roosevelt Roads. These aircraft were officially retired on 3 May 2003.

Skyhawks were well loved by their crews for being tough and agile. These attributes, along with their low purchase and operating cost as well as easy maintenance, have contributed to the popularity of the A-4 with American and international armed forces. Besides the U.S., at least three other nations have used A-4 Skyhawks in combat (Argentina, Israel, and Kuwait).

Vietnam War era

Skyhawks were the U.S. Navy's primary light attack aircraft used over North Vietnam during the early years of the Vietnam War; they were later supplanted by the A-7 Corsair II in the U.S. Navy light attack role. Skyhawks carried out some of the first air strikes by the US during the conflict, and a Marine Skyhawk is believed to have dropped the last American bombs on the country. Notable naval aviators who flew the Skyhawk included Lieutenant Commanders Everett Alvarez, Jr. and John McCain, and Commander James Stockdale. On 1 May 1967, an A-4C Skyhawk piloted by Lieutenant Commander Theodore R. Swartz of VA-76 aboard the carrier , shot down a North Vietnamese Air Force MiG-17 with an unguided Zuni rocket as the Skyhawk's only air-to-air victory of the Vietnam War.

From 1956 on, Navy Skyhawks were the first aircraft to be deployed outside of the U.S. armed with the AIM-9 Sidewinder. On strike missions, which was the Skyhawk's normal role, the air-to-air armament was for self-defense purposes.

In the early to mid-1960s, standard U.S. Navy A-4B Skyhawk squadrons were assigned to provide fighter protection for anti-submarine warfare aircraft operating from some Essex-class U.S. anti-submarine warfare carriers; these aircraft retained their ground- and sea-attack capabilities. The A-4B model did not have an air-to-air radar, and it required visual identification of targets and guidance from either ships in the fleet or an airborne Grumman E-1 Tracer AEW aircraft.

Lightweight and safer to land on smaller decks, Skyhawks would later also play a similar role flying from Australian, Argentinean, and Brazilian upgraded World War II surplus light ASW carriers, which were unable to operate most large modern fighters. Primary air-to-air armament consisted of the internal 20 mm (.79 in) Colt cannons and ability to carry an AIM-9 Sidewinder missile on both underwing hardpoints, later additions of two more underwing hardpoints on some aircraft made for a total capacity of four AAMs.

The first combat loss of an A-4 occurred on 5 August 1964, when Lieutenant junior grade Everett Alvarez, of VA-144 aboard , was shot down while attacking enemy torpedo boats in North Vietnam. Alvarez safely ejected after being hit by anti-aircraft artillery (AAA) fire, and became the first US Naval POW of the war. He was released as a POW on 12 February 1973. The last A-4 loss in the Vietnam War occurred on 26 September 1972, when USMC pilot Captain James P. Walsh, USMC of VMA-211, flying close air support from Bien Hoa Air Base, South Vietnam, was hit by ground fire during the Battle of An Lộc. Captain Walsh ejected safely and was the last U.S. Marine to be taken prisoner during the war. He was released as a POW on 12 February 1973.

Although the first A-4Es were flown in Vietnam in early 1965, the A-4Cs continued to be used until late 1970. On 1 June 1965, the Chu Lai Short Airfield for Tactical Support (SATS) was officially opened with the arrival of eight A-4 Skyhawks from Cubi Point, Philippine Islands. The group landed with the aid of arresting cables, refueled and took off with the aid of JATO, with fuel and bombs to support Marine combat units. The Skyhawks were from Marine Attack Squadron VMA-225 and VMA-311.

Lieutenant commander Michael J. Estocin of Attack Squadron 192 was posthumously awarded the Medal of Honor for his actions while flying surface-to-air missile (SAM) suppression during coordinated strikes against targets in Haiphong, North Vietnam, on April 20 and April 26, 1967.

On 29 July 1967, the aircraft carrier  was conducting combat operations in the Gulf of Tonkin during the Vietnam War. A Zuni rocket misfired, striking an external tank on an A-4. Fuel from the leaking tank caught fire, creating a massive conflagration that burned for hours, killing 134 sailors, and injuring 161.

During the war, 362 A-4/TA-4F Skyhawks were lost due to all causes. The U.S. Navy lost 271 A-4s, the U.S. Marine Corps lost 81 A-4s and 10 TA-4Fs. A total of 32 A-4s were lost to surface-to-air missiles (SAMs), and one A-4 was lost in aerial combat to a MiG-17 on 25 April 1967.

Training and adversary role
The A-4 Skyhawk, in the two-seat TA-4J configuration, was introduced to a training role replacing the TF-9J Cougar. The TA-4J served as the advanced jet trainer in white and orange markings for decades until being replaced by the T-45 Goshawk. Additional TA-4Js were assigned to Instrument Training RAGs at all the Navy master jet bases under RCVW-12 and RCVW-4. The Instrument RAGs initially provided jet transition training for Naval Aviators during the time period when Naval Aviation still had a great number of propeller-driven aircraft and also provided annual instrument training and check rides for Naval Aviators. The assigned TA-4J models were installed with collapsible hoods so the aviator under training had to demonstrate instrument flying skills without any outside reference. These units were VF-126 at NAS Miramar, California; VA-127 (later VFA-127; NAS FALLON, NV) at NAS Lemoore, California; VF-43 at NAS Oceana, Virginia; and VA-45 (later VF-45) at NAS Cecil Field, Florida until its later move to NAS Key West, Florida.

Additional single-seat A-4 Skyhawks were also assigned to composite squadrons (VC) worldwide to provide training and other services to deployed units. These included VC-1 at NAS Barbers Point, Hawaii; VC-7 at NAS Miramar, California; VC-5 at NAS Cubi Point, Philippines; VC-8 at NS Roosevelt Roads, Puerto Rico; VC-10 at NAVBASE Guantánamo Bay, Cuba, and Naval Reserve squadrons VC-12 (later VFC-12) at NAS Oceana, Virginia and VC-13 (later VFC-13) at NAS Miramar, California until its later move to NAS Fallon, Nevada.

With renewed emphasis on Air Combat Maneuvering (ACM) training brought on with the establishment of the Navy Fighter Weapons School (TOPGUN) in 1969, the availability of A-4 Skyhawks in both the Instrument RAGs and Composite Squadrons at the master jet bases presented a ready resource of the nimble Skyhawks that had become the TOPGUN preferred surrogate for the MiG-17. At the time, the F-4 Phantom was just beginning to be exploited to its full potential as a fighter and had not performed as well as expected against the smaller North Vietnamese MiG-17 and MiG-21 opponents. TOPGUN introduced the notion of dissimilar air combat training (DACT) using modified A-4E/Fs. Modified aircraft, called "Mongoose", lost the dorsal hump, the 20 mm cannon with their ammo systems, and the external stores, although sometimes the centerline station was kept. The slats were fixed.

The small size of the Skyhawk and superb low speed handling in the hands of a well trained aviator made it ideal to teach fleet aviators the finer points of DACT. The squadrons eventually began to display vivid threat type paint schemes signifying their transition into the primary role of Adversary training. To better perform the Adversary role, single-seat A-4E and F models were introduced into the role, but the ultimate adversary Skyhawk was the Super Fox, which was equipped with the uprated J52-P-408 engine. This variant had entered service in 1974 with VA-55/VA-164/VA-212 on the final USS Hancock cruise and had been the variant that the Blue Angels had selected in 1973.

The surplus of former USMC Skyhawks resulted in A-4M versions being used by both VF-126 and TOPGUN. Even though the A-4 was augmented by the F-5E, F-21 (Kfir), F-16, and F/A-18 in the adversary role, the A-4 remained a viable threat surrogate until it was retired by VF-43 in 1993 and shortly thereafter by VFC-12. The last A-4 fleet operators were VC-8, which retired its Skyhawks in 2003.

The A-4M was also operated by the Operations Maintenance Detachment (OMD) in an adversary role based at NAS Dallas, Texas for the Naval Air Reserve. Many of the aviators that flew the four jets were attached to NAS Dallas, including the Commanding Officer of the air station. The aircraft were instrumental in training and development of ACM for Naval Air Reserve fighter squadrons VF-201 and VF-202 flying the F-4 Phantom II and later the Grumman F-14 Tomcat. The unit also completed several missions involving target towing to NAS Key West, Florida; NAS Kingsville, Texas, and deployments to NAS Miramar, California and NAS Fallon, Nevada for adversary support. The detachment was under the operational command of the Commander Fleet Logistics Support Wing (CFLSW), also based at NAS Dallas.

Israel

Israel was the largest export customer for Skyhawks.  The Skyhawk was the first U.S. warplane to be offered to the Israeli Air Force, marking the point where the U.S. took over from France as Israel's chief military supplier.  Deliveries began after the Six-Day War, and A-4s soon formed the backbone of the IAF's ground-attack force.  In IAF Service, the A-4 Skyhawk was named as the Ayit (for Eagle).

They cost only a quarter of what a Phantom II cost and carried half of its payload.  Starting in 1966, Israel purchased 217 A-4s, plus another 46 that were transferred from U.S. units in Operation Nickel Grass to compensate for large losses during the Yom Kippur War.

In the late 1960s and 1970s, Israeli Air Force Skyhawks were the primary ground attack aircraft in the War of Attrition and the Yom Kippur War. Skyhawks carried out bombing missions in the Yom Kippur War, and a considerable proportion of the tactical sorties.  ACIG.org claims that at least nine A-4 Skyhawks were downed by MiG-21s and MiG-17s during Yom Kippur war. Formal Israeli sources claim only five Israeli Air Force aircraft, of any type, were shot down in air-to-air duels.

In May 1970, an Israeli Skyhawk piloted by Col. Ezra Dotan shot down two MiG-17s over south Lebanon (one with unguided rockets, the other with 30 mm cannon fire) even though the Skyhawk's head-up display has no "air-to-air mode". However, up to three Skyhawks were downed by Egyptian MiG-21 fighters, plus two were downed by Soviet-piloted MiG-21s during the War of Attrition.

A special version of the A-4 was developed for the IAF, the A-4H. This was an A-4E which featured improved avionics and the improved thrust J52-P-8A engine. Armament consisted of twin DEFA 30 mm cannon in place of the Colt Mk.12 20 mm cannons. Later modifications included the avionics hump and an extended tailpipe, implemented in Israel by IAI. The extended tailpipe gave greater protection against heat-seeking surface-to-air missiles. A total of 90 A-4Hs were delivered, and were Heyl Ha'avir's (Israels Air Force) primary attack plane in the War of Attrition.

In early 1973, the improved A-4N Skyhawk for Israel entered service, based on the A-4M models used by the U.S. Marine Corps. The different model Skyhawks carried out bombing missions in the Yom Kippur War, and a considerable proportion of the tactical sorties. They also attacked in Operation Peace for the Galilee, and one of them shot down a Syrian MiG-17.

The IAF also operated two-seat models, for operations as well as advanced training and retraining. The first training models arrived in 1967, with the first batch of Skyhawks. During the Yom Kippur war, the Skyhawk order of battle was reinforced with TA-4F and TA-4J models. The IAF selected in 2003 RADA Electronic Industries Ltd. to upgrade its A-4 trainer fleet with weapon delivery, navigation and training systems. Integration of a multifunction and Head-up Display produced an advanced Lead in fighter trainer for the IAF's future fighter pilots.

According to acig.org, Syria claimed that two Israeli A-4 Skyhawks were downed by Syrian MiG-23s over northern Lebanon on 26 April 1981. However, official Israeli Air Force statistics do not list any downing of Israeli warplanes since the Yom Kippur War, and no loss of aircraft was reported on that date.

During the 1982 Lebanon War an Israeli A-4 piloted by Aharon Achiaz was shot down over Lebanon by a SA-7 on 6 June 1982. Israel reported this was one of its only two fixed-wing aircraft shot down over the Beqaa Valley during air battles spanning from 6 June 1982 to 11 June 1982 where 150 aircraft took part, including the battle on 9 June 1982 known as Operation Mole Cricket 19.

In October 2008, it was decided due to maintenance issues that the A-4 Skyhawk fleet would be withdrawn and replaced by more modern aircraft, able to perform equally well in the training role and, if required, close support and interdiction missions on the battlefield. Some of Israel's A-4s were later exported to Indonesia. The Skyhawks have been replaced by F-16s in combat roles but are still used for pilot training. All the remaining A-4s aircraft were to be fully phased out beginning by 2014 as the IAF accepts delivery of Alenia Aermacchi M-346 Master jets. Skyhawks were last used in combat operations in the Israel airforce in 2012, when they dropped leaflets over Gaza in 2012.

In July 2013, Israel began a program called Teuza (boldness) for the purpose of turning some military bases into sales lots for obsolete IDF equipment.  Older models that are not suited for Israel's modern high-tech forces will be sold off, or sold for scrap if there are no buyers.  A-4 Skyhawk jets are among those being offered.

On 13 December 2015, all remaining Israeli A-4 Skyhawks were retired from service. The retirement ceremony took place at Hatzerim IDF base.

Argentina

Argentina was the first foreign user of the Skyhawk and had nearly 130 A-4s delivered since 1965. The Argentine Air Force received 25 A-4Bs in 1966 and another 25 in 1970, all refurbished in the United States by Lockheed Service Co. prior to their delivery as A-4P, although they were still locally known as A-4B. They had three weapon pylons and served in the 5th Air Brigade. In 1976, 25 A-4Cs were ordered to replace the F-86 Sabres still in service in the 4th Air Brigade. They were received as is and refurbished to flight status by Air Force technicians at Río Cuarto, Córdoba. The C model had five weapon pylons and could use AIM-9B Sidewinder air-to-air missiles.

The Argentine Naval Aviation also bought the Skyhawk known as A-4Q in the form of 16 A-4Bs in 1972, which unlike the Air Force's A-4Ps, were powered by  J-65-W-20 engines and fitted to use Sidewinder air-to-air missiles. They were received in 1972 to be used mainly from the aircraft carrier ARA Veinticinco de Mayo by the 3rd Fighter/Attack Squadron.

The U.S. placed an embargo of spare parts in 1977 due to the Dirty War backing the Humphrey-Kennedy amendment to the Foreign Assistance Act of 1976, the Carter administration placed an embargo on the sale of arms and spare parts to Argentina and on the training of its military personnel (which was lifted in the 1990s under Carlos Menem's presidency when Argentina became a major non-NATO ally). Ejection seats did not work and there were many other mechanical faults. In spite of this, A-4s still served well in the 1982 Falklands War.

Falklands War

During the 1982 Falklands War, Argentina deployed 48 Skyhawk warplanes (26 A-4B, 12 A-4C and 10 A-4Q aircraft).

Argentine Navy A-4Qs, flying from Río Grande, Tierra del Fuego naval air station, also played a role in the bombing attacks against British ships, destroying the Type 21 .

In all, 22 Skyhawks (10 A-4Bs, nine A-4Cs, and three A-4Qs) were lost to all causes in the six-week-long war. These losses included eight to British Sea Harriers, seven to ship-launched surface-to-air missiles, four to ground-launched surface-to-air missiles and anti-aircraft fire (including one to "friendly fire"), and three to crashes.

Postwar 

After the war, Argentine Air Force A-4Ps and A-4Cs survivors were upgraded under the Halcón (Spanish for "falcon") program with  DEFA cannons, air-to-air missiles, and other minor details, and merged into the 5th Air Brigade. All of these were withdrawn from service in 1999, and they were replaced with 36 of the much-improved Lockheed Martin OA/A-4AR Fightinghawk (rebuilt and modernised ex USMC A-4M). Several TA-4J and A-4E airframes were also delivered under the A-4AR program, mainly for spare parts use.  The A-4AR was in service between the late 1990s and 2016 when the majority of the fleet was grounded for serviceability and age.  A small number of airframes remained in service for limited roles.  Three aircraft were lost to accidents.

In 1983, the United States vetoed the delivery by Israel of 24 A-4Hs for the Argentine Navy as the A-4Q replacement. The A-4Qs were finally retired in 1988.

Kuwait

Kuwaiti Air Force Skyhawks fought in 1991 during Operation Desert Storm. When Iraq invaded Kuwait, the available Skyhawks flew attack missions against the advancing Iraqi forces from deserted roads after their bases were overrun. Twenty-four of the 29 A-4KUs that remained in service with Kuwait (36 had been delivered in the 1970s) escaped to Saudi Arabia. The escaped Skyhawks (along with escaped Dassault Mirage F1s) operated as the Free Kuwait Air Force, flying 1,361 sorties during the liberation of Kuwait. 

Twenty-three A-4s survived the conflict and the Iraqi invasion, with only one A-4KU (KAF-828, BuNo. 160207) shot down by Iraqi radar-guided SAM on 17 January 1991. The pilot, Mohammed Mubarak, ejected and was taken prisoner. The remaining Kuwaiti Skyhawks were later sold to Brazil, where they served aboard the aircraft carrier NAe São Paulo prior to its decommissioning in February 2017.

Australia

The aircraft were acquired in two batches of 10, in 1967 and 1971, and were primarily used to provide air defence for the fleet. Ten of the A-4Gs were destroyed in accidents, and all the survivors were sold to the Royal New Zealand Air Force in 1984.

New Zealand

In 1970, 10 A-4K single-seat aircraft and 4 TA-4K were delivered to the Royal New Zealand Air Force, joining 75 Squadron. These were joined by 8 A-4G Skyhawk and 2 TA-4Gs from the Royal Australian Navy in 1984, which allowed a second Skyhawk-equipped squadron, 2 Squadron, to form. In 1986, Project Kahu was launched to upgrade New Zealand's Skyhawks with new avionics, including an AN/APG-66NZ radar based on that used by the F-16, and weapons, as a lower-cost alternative to buying new replacements. All 10 ex-RAN and the 12 surviving original RNZAF aircraft were converted to the A-4K Kahu standard.

In 2001 the three Air Combat Force squadrons (Nos 2, 14, and 75) were disbanded and the Skyhawks put into storage awaiting sale. They were maintained, with occasional servicing flights, and then moved to RNZAF Base Woodbourne, where they were preserved in protective latex. Draken International signed an agreement with the New Zealand government in 2012 to purchase eight A-4Ks and associated equipment for its adversary training services. Six were former RAN A-4G airframes which as carrier aircraft had logged significantly fewer flying hours. These were subsequently relocated to the U.S. at Draken's Lakeland Linder International Airport facility in Lakeland, Florida. The other A-4K aircraft were given to museums in New Zealand and Australia.

Indonesia

Due to the declining relationship between Indonesia and the Soviet Union, there was a lack of spare parts for military hardware supplied by the Communist Bloc. Soon, most of them were scrapped. The Indonesian Air Force (TNI-AU) acquired A-4 Skyhawks to replace its Il-28 Beagles and Tu-16 Badgers in a covert operation with Israel, since both countries did not maintain diplomatic relationships. These A-4s were chosen because the IDF planned to retire its A-4 squadrons. The A-4 served the Indonesian Air Force from 1982 until 2003.

Malaysia
In 1982, Malaysia purchased 80 refurbished A-4C and A-4L under a modernization program called PERISTA. Forty of the airframes were upgraded with the Hughes AN/ASB-19 Angle Rate Bombing System, air refueling capability, and increased payload, while the rest were kept in the United States as a reserve and for spare parts. This modified version was redesignated as A-4PTM (peculiar to Malaysia).

The aircraft were delivered to the Royal Malaysian Air Force (RMAF) in December 1984 where they served in the No.6 and No.9 RMAF Squadrons at Kuantan air base. While in service, they suffered from frequent maintenance issues and a high accident rate. In 1995, they were finally retired and replaced with BAE Systems Hawks.

Brazil
As of 2014, Brazil is the latest Skyhawk customer. In 1997 Brazil negotiated a $70 million contract for purchase of 20 A-4KU and three TA-4KU Skyhawks from Kuwait. Kuwait's Skyhawks, modified A-4Ms and TA-4Js delivered in 1977, were among the last of those models built by Douglas. The aircraft were selected by Brazil because of low flight time, excellent physical condition, and a favorable price. The Brazilian Navy re-designated AF-1 and AF-1A Falcões (Hawks), the Kuwaiti Skyhawks arrived in Arraial do Cabo on 5 September 1998. 

On 18 January 2001, an AF-1 trapped aboard the Brazilian aircraft carrier  was later successfully catapulted, making Brazil's fixed-wing carrier force operational again after nearly two decades. To replace the aging Minas Gerais, Brazil purchased the surplus  on 15 November 2001. Renamed , the "new" carrier received extensive refitting before becoming operational in 2003. Minas Gerais was decommissioned and retired that year.

On 14 April 2009, Embraer signed a contract to modernize 12 Brazilian Navy aircraft, nine AF-1s (single-seat) and three AF-1As (two-seat). This upgrade will restore the operating capacity of the Navy 1st Intercept and Attack Plane Squadron. The program includes restoring the aircraft and their current systems, as well as implementing new avionics, radar, power production, and autonomous oxygen generating systems. The first of the 12 modified Skyhawks was delivered on 27 May 2015. Embraer stated the modifications will allow the aircraft to remain operational until 2025.

In 2017, the Brazilian Navy indicated that it was reconsidering the total number of aircraft to be modernized to AF-1B/C standard due to budget constraints and the decommissioning of the São Paulo. Two AF-1Bs were delivered in 2015 and a further two of undisclosed type are to be delivered in 2017. It is believed that despite the loss of its only carrier, the Navy wants to retain the experience of carrier-based operations, and thus will not rescind the contract outright. As of 2022, there are 3 A-4s in service, with 3 used for training and the other aircraft on display.

Others

Top Aces, formerly Discovery Air Defense Services, a private Canadian company contracted by the Canadian Armed Forces, Australian Defence Force, and Bundeswehr to provide air combat and fighter training, imported and registered ten A-4N and TA-4J aircraft. Discovery upgraded and modified the jets to be capable of Electronic Warfare training. Top Aces also operates A-4Ns under contract for training of the German Armed Forces (Bundeswehr). Another major civil user of A-4s for training support to military forces is US-based Draken International, which operates ex-New Zealand A-4Ks as part of a diverse fleet of jets. A-4s have previously been operated in the target support role in Germany by Tracor Flight Systems.

Variants

Original production variants
XA4D-1 Initial prototype, one built.
YA4D-1 Flight test prototypes and pre-production aircraft; redesignated YA-4A in 1962, then A-4A, 19 built.
A4D-1 [A-4A] Initial production version; redesignated A-4A in 1962, 166 built.
A4D-2 [A-4B] Strengthened aircraft and added air-to-air refueling capabilities, improved navigation and flight control systems, provision for AGM-12 Bullpup missile; redesignated A-4B in 1962, 542 built.
A4D-2N [A-4C] Night/adverse weather version of A4D-2, with AN/APG-53A radar, autopilot, LABS low-altitude bombing system.
A4D-3 Proposed advanced avionics version, none built.
A4D-4 Proposed long-range version with new wings; none built.
Many later upgraded with J52‑P‑8 engine with  thrust; redesignated A-4E in 1962, 499 built.
A4D-6 Proposed enlarged version of the A4D-5, none built.
Some served with Blue Angels acrobatic team from 1973 to 1986.
A-4G Eight aircraft built new for the Royal Australian Navy with minor variations from the A-4F; in particular, they were not fitted with the avionics "hump". Subsequently, eight more A-4Fs were modified to this standard for the RAN. Significantly the A-4G were modified to carry four underwing Sidewinder AIM-9B missiles increasing their Fleet Defense capability. Sold in 1984 to the Royal New Zealand Air Force and later rebuilt in Project KAHU as A-4Ks.
A-4H 90 aircraft for the Israeli Air Force based on the A-4F. Used 30 mm (1.18 in) DEFA cannon with 150 rpg in place of U.S. 20 mm (.79 in) guns. Later, some A-4Es later locally modified to this standard. Subsequently, modified with extended jetpipes as protection against heat-seeking missiles.
A-4K 10 aircraft for Royal New Zealand Air Force. In the 1990s, these were upgraded under Project KAHU with new radar and avionics, provision for AGM-65 Maverick, AIM-9 Sidewinder, and GBU-16 Paveway II laser-guided bomb. The RNZAF also rebuilt an A-4C and 10 A-4Gs to A-4K standard. 
A-4M Skyhawk II Dedicated Marine version with improved avionics and more powerful J52-P-408 engine with  thrust, enlarged cockpit, IFF system. Later fitted with Hughes AN/ASB-19 Angle Rate Bombing System (ARBS) with TV and laser spot tracker, 158 built.
 117 modified A-4Ms for the Israeli Air Force.
TA-4F Conversion trainer – standard A-4F with extra seat for an instructor, 241 built.
TA-4G two trainer versions of the A-4G built new, and two more modified from TA-4Fs.
TA-4H 25 trainer versions of the A-4H. Upgraded with more modern avionics.
 Dedicated trainer version based on A-4F, but lacking weapons systems, and with down-rated engine, 277 built new, and most TA-4Fs were later converted to this configuration.
TA-4K Four trainer versions of the TA-4J. A fifth, non-flying display example was later assembled in NZ from spare parts.

Upgraded, modified and export variants
TA-4E Two A-4Es modified as prototypes of a trainer version.
EA-4F Four TA-4Fs converted for ECM training.
A-4L 100 A-4Cs remanufactured for Marine Corps Reserves and Navy Reserve squadrons. Fitted with A-4F avionics (including the fuselage "hump") but retaining J-65 engine and three-pylon wing.
OA-4M 23 TA-4Fs modified for Forward Air Control duties.
A-4P Remanufactured A-4Bs sold to Argentine Air Force, known as A-4B by the Argentines.
A-4Q Remanufactured A-4Bs sold to Argentine Navy.
A-4Y Provisional designation for A-4Ms modified with the ARBS. Designation never adopted by the U.S. Navy or U.S. Marine Corps.
A-4AR Fightinghawk 36 A-4Ms refurbished for Argentina. 
OA-4AR Fightinghawk Refurbished two-seat training version for Argentina.
CA-4F A proposed two seat variant for the Royal Canadian Navy based on the A-4E with a dorsal conformal fuel tank instead of an avionics hump, it was to have replaced the F2H-3 Banshee on HMCS Bonaventure.  Canada expressed little interest and so it was never placed in production.
A-4KU 30 modified A-4Ms for the Kuwaiti Air Force. Brazil purchased 20 of these second-hand and redesignated them AF-1. Now used by the Brazilian Navy on carrier duty.
TA-4KU Three trainer versions of the above. Brazil purchased some of these second-hand and redesignated them AF-1A.
A-4PTM 40 A-4Cs and A-4Ls refurbished for Royal Malaysian Air Force, incorporating many A-4M features (PTM stands for Peculiar to Malaysia).
TA-4PTM Unique trainer version for Royal Malaysian Air Force. Converted from A-4C/L airframes with 28" fuselage plug and second cockpit, similar to TA-4F/J (PTM stands for Peculiar to Malaysia).
A-4S 50 A-4Bs remanufactured for Republic of Singapore Air Force.
TA-4S Seven trainer versions of the above. Different from most TA-4 trainers with a common cockpit for the student and instructor pilot, these were essentially rebuilt with a  fuselage plug inserted into the front fuselage and a separate bulged cockpit (giving better all round visibility) for the instructor seated behind the student pilot.
A-4S-1 50 A-4Cs remanufactured for the Republic of Singapore Air Force.
TA-4S-1 Eight trainer versions of the above. These were designated as TA-4S-1 to set it apart from the earlier batch of seven airframes.
A-4SU Super Skyhawk Extensively modified and updated version of the A-4S-1, exclusively for the Republic of Singapore Air Force, fitted with a General Electric F404 non-afterburning turbofan engine, and modernized electronics.
TA-4SU Super Skyhawk Extensively modified and updated version of the TA-4S & TA-4S-1 to TA-4SU standard.
AF-1/1A Brazilian Navy designation applied to 23 A-4KU and TA-4KU aircraft acquired from the Kuwaiti Air Force.
AF-1B/C Brazilian Navy upgraded version of AF-1/1A by Embraer and AEL Sistemas. Changes from analog to digital avionics, new radar systems, improved communications equipment and weapons.

Operators

 Argentine Air Force – use the modernized version A-4AR as fighter and fighter trainer.

 Brazilian Navy – 4 modernized A-4KUs in operation and 3 A-4KUs for training

 Top Aces Inc. - Owns and operates thirteen A-4N and one TA-4J for use as trainer and aggressor aircraft.

 Draken International – owns and operates 7 former New Zealand A/TA-4Ks and 6 former Israeli A-4Ns.
 AeroGroup, a private American commercial company operating previously owned A-4 aircraft.
 A-4L, LLC - Owns seven and currently operates three A-4L (A4D-2N) Skyhawks based at KGYI North Texas Regional Airport/Perrin Field in Denison Texas.

Former operators

 Argentine Navy

 Royal Australian Navy – sold to RNZAF

 Indonesian Air Force (TNI-AU) – retired in 2003

 Israeli Air Force – retired from frontline duty in 2008, retired from training flights in December 2015.

 Kuwait Air Force – sold to Brazilian Navy

 Royal Malaysian Air Force – retired from service

 Royal New Zealand Air Force – retired in 2001

 Republic of Singapore Air Force retired from frontline service in 2005, and were transferred to France (Cazaux Air Base) as advanced jet trainers. The Skyhawks were retired from training flights from 2013 and replaced by the Alenia Aermacchi M-346. 1 RSAF A-4SU was donated to the Institute of Technical Education (ITE College Central) for vocational and training purposes.

 United States Navy
 United States Marine Corps

Aircraft on display

Given the number of air forces that operated the Skyhawk, a significant number have been preserved, either airworthy or on display. Preserved A-4s can be found in Argentina, Australia, Brazil, France, Israel, Japan, Netherlands, New Zealand, Singapore, United States, and others.

Specifications (A4D-5 / A-4E Skyhawk)

Notable appearances in media

See also

References

Notes

Bibliography

 Aloni, Shlomo. Israeli A-4 Skyhawk Units in Combat (Osprey Combat Aircraft #81). Oxford, UK: Osprey Publishing Limited, 2009. .
 "ASN Wikibase Occurrence # 153270." aviation-safety.net. Retrieved: 5 May 2013.
 Chant, Chris. Air War in the Falklands 1982 (Osprey Combat Aircraft #28). Oxford, UK: Osprey Publishing, 2001. .
 Dorr, Robert F. and Chris Bishop. Vietnam Air War Debrief. London: Aerospace Publishing, 1996. .
 Drendel, Lou. A-4 Skyhawk in Action. Carrollton, Texas: Squadron/Signal Publications, 1973. .
 Elward, Brad. McDonnell Douglas A-4 Skyhawk. Ramsbury, Wiltshire, UK: Crowood Press, 2000. .
 Gann, Harry S. "Douglas A-4 Skyhawk Variant Briefing: Part 1". Wings of Fame, Volume 4. London: Aerospace Publishing, 1996, pp. 98–117. .
 Gann, Harry S. "Douglas A-4 Skyhawk Variant Briefing: Part 2: Export Versions". Wings of Fame, Volume 5. London: Aerospace Publishing, 1996, pp. 130–145. .
 Grossnick, Roy A. and William J. Armstrong. United States Naval Aviation, 1910–1995. Annapolis, Maryland: Naval Historical Center, 1997. .
 Hobson, Chris. Vietnam Air Losses, USAF/USN/USMC, Fixed-Wing Aircraft Losses in Southeast Asia, 1961–1973. North Branch, Minnesota: Specialty Press, 2001. .
 Kilduff, Peter. Douglas A-4 Skyhawk. London: Osprey Publishing, 1983. .
 McCarthy, Donald J. Jr. MiG Killers: A Chronology of US Air Victories in Vietnam 1965–1973. North Branch, Minnesota: Specialty Pr Pub & Wholesalers, 2009. .
 Mersky, Peter. US Navy and Marine Corps A-4 Skyhawk Units of the Vietnam War (Osprey Combat Aircraft #69). Oxford, UK: Osprey Publishing Limited, 2007. .
 Parsons, Dave and Derek Nelson. Bandits!: Pictorial History of American Adversarial Aircraft. St. Paul, Minnesota: Motorbooks International, 1993. .
 Peacock, Lindsey. A-4 Skyhawk (Osprey Combat Aircraft series). London: Osprey Publications, 1987. .
 Wilson, Stewart. Phantom, Hornet and Skyhawk in Australian Service. Weston Creek, ACT, Australia: Aerospace Publications, 1993. .

Further reading
 Núñez Padin, Jorge Felix. McDonnell Douglas A-4C Skyhawk, Volume 21 (Serie Fuerza Aérea). Bahía Blanca, Argentina Fuerzas Aeronavales, 2011 .
 Núñez Padin, and Jorge Felix. McDonnell Douglas A-4Q & A-4E Skyhawk, Volume 31 (Serie Aeronaval) Bahía Blanca, Argentina Fuerzas Aeronavales, 2013. .

External links

 Royal Australian Navy Fleet Air Arm Museum Skyhawk information
 A-4 Skyhawk page on Boeing.com
 RNZAF Museum Skyhawk page
 Serial number history of Australian A-4 Skyhawks, prefix N13 
 A-4 at Combat Air Museum
 A-4 Skyhawk  from reference book American Combat Planes of the 20th Century by R. Wagner
 AeroWeb.org A-4 Skyhawks on display
 restoration to flight of a TA-4J 
 (1962) NAVWEPS 01-40AVA-1 Flight Handbook Navy Model A4D-1 and A4D-2 Aircraft
 "A-4D Skyhawk" a 1958 Flight article
 "Tantalizing Tinker Toy" (pilot report), Budd Davisson, March, 1975, Air Progress. 

 
A-004 Skyhawk
1950s United States attack aircraft
Single-engined jet aircraft
Carrier-based aircraft
Cruciform tail aircraft
Low-wing aircraft
Aircraft first flown in 1954